The Grasshopper Cup 2015 is the Grasshopper Cup for 2015, which is a tournament of the PSA World Tour event International (Prize money: 70 000 $). The event took place in Zurich in Switzerland from 15 to 19 April. Grégory Gaultier won his first Grasshopper Cup trophy, beating Simon Rösner in the final.

Prize money and ranking points
For 2015, the prize purse was $70,000. The prize money and points breakdown is as follows:

Seeds

Draw and results

See also
2015 PSA World Tour
Grasshopper Cup

References

External links
PSA Grasshopper Cup 2015 website
Grasshopper Cup 2015 official website

2015 in squash
2015 in Swiss sport
Squash tournaments in Switzerland
Sport in Zürich